Albert Leonard Jacobson [born Albin Leonard Jacobson] (June 5, 1881 – January 31, 1933) was a pitcher in Major League Baseball who played for three different teams between  and .

A native of Port Washington, Wisconsin, Jacobson always was a bad luck pitcher either due to injury or playing on a bad baseball team. He entered the majors in 1904 with the Washington Senators, playing for them two years before joining the St. Louis Browns (1906–1997) and Boston Americans (1907).

Jacobson went 6–23 in his rookie season for the last-place 1904 Senators, despite a 3.55 earned run average and career-best numbers in strikeouts (75) and innings pitched (. At the end of 1905, he was sent by Washington to the Browns in the same transaction that brought Willie Sudhoff to the Senators. His most productive season came in 1906 with St. Louis, when he went 9–9 with a career-high 2.50 earned run average. A year later, he suffered arm problems and was dealt to Boston in exchange for Bill Dineen. He had a combined 1–6 mark in only nine appearances and never played a major league game again.

In a four-season career, Jacobson posted a 23–46 record with 195 strikeouts and a 3.19 earned run average in 88 games, including 70 starts, 53 complete games, one shutout, and  innings of work.

After that, Jacobson played for several minor league teams. He enjoyed a good season with the 1911 Kalamazoo Celery Pickers champion team of the Southern Michigan League, when he led the league pitchers with 26 wins and a .743 winning percentage.

Jacobson died in Decatur, Illinois, at the age of 51.

Sources
Baseball Reference
Retrosheet

Major League Baseball pitchers
Washington Senators (1901–1960) players
St. Louis Browns players
Boston Americans players
Baseball players from Wisconsin
1881 births
1933 deaths
People from Port Washington, Wisconsin
Milwaukee Brewers (minor league) players
Decatur Commodores players
Toronto Maple Leafs (International League) players
Grand Rapids Raiders players
Kalamazoo Celery Pickers players
Kalamazoo Kazoos players
Sportspeople from the Milwaukee metropolitan area